The Battle of the Rishki Pass or Battle of Veregava took place in the pass of the same name, in Stara Planina, Bulgaria in 759. It was fought between the Bulgarian Empire and the Byzantine Empire. The result was a Bulgarian victory.

Origins of the conflict
Between 755 and 775, the Byzantine emperor Constantine V organised nine campaigns to eliminate Bulgaria and although he managed to defeat the Bulgarians several times, he never achieved his goal.

The battle
In 759, the emperor led an army towards Bulgaria, but Khan Vinekh had enough time to bar several mountain passes. When the Byzantines reached the Rishki Pass (identification tentative, originally  ‘to the klisura of Veregava’) they were ambushed and completely defeated. The Byzantine historian Theophanes the Confessor wrote that the Bulgarians killed the strategos of Thrace Leo, the commander of Drama, and many soldiers.

Aftermath
Khan Vinekh did not take the favourable opportunity to advance on enemy territory and sued for peace. This act was very unpopular among the nobles and the Khan was murdered in 761.

References

750s conflicts
Balkan mountains
8th century in Bulgaria
750s in the Byzantine Empire
Battles involving the First Bulgarian Empire
Battles of the Byzantine–Bulgarian Wars in Thrace
Military history of Bulgaria
759